Michaela Fukačová (born 27 March 1959) is a Czech cellist.  She took up the cello aged 14, and won the Beethoven Cello Competition two years later. She is a past winner of the Tchaikovsky Competition in Moscow. She studied at the Brno Conservatory, the Music Faculty of the Academy of Performing Arts in Prague (HAMU) under Saša Večtomov, the Royal Danish Academy of Music in Copenhagen, and with André Navarra, Paul Tortelier and Mstislav Rostropovich.

Awards and prizes
Prague Spring Cello competition 1984
Tchaikovsky Cello competition, Moscow 1986
Cello Competition in Scheveningen 1987	
Walter Naumburg Competition, New York 1989 "Leonard Rose price"
Nordic Biennale,  Denmark 1987	
The Danish music critics award, 1988
Grammy nomination for the best classical album, Denmark 1990
"Grammy Classic" award for the best soloist of the year, Prague 1994
Honorary member of the Academy in Sorø, Denmark 1995
Member of The Czech Council of Foreign Relations 1992
The Gramophone award for the CD with music of Peter Lieberson, 2006
Grammy 07 nomination for the best classical album of the year, USA

References

External links
Official website
http://www.rozhlas.cz/socr_eng/reviews/_zprava/685382
https://www.youtube.com/user/miap1701?feature=mhw5#p/a/u/0/yJVeTKhMAbM

Living people
Czech classical cellists
1959 births
Academy of Performing Arts in Prague alumni
Royal Danish Academy of Music alumni
Women classical cellists
Brno Conservatory alumni